Joseph Mantell (né Mantel; December 21, 1915 – September 29, 2010) was an American film and television actor. He was nominated for an Academy Award for Best Supporting Actor for his role as best friend Angie in the 1955 film Marty, which he reprised from the original live teleplay with the same creative team. The teleplay was a surprise hit and the film won the Academy Award for Best Picture.

Early life
Joseph Mantel was born in the Brooklyn borough of New York City to Jewish immigrant parents from the Kingdom of Galicia, a region in Eastern Europe controlled by the Emperor of Austria. His father was a butcher, the family name originally was spelled Mantel and accented on the first syllable, but at the beginning of his acting career, Mantell added the extra "L" and changed the pronunciation to "Man-TELL". 

He served in the army during the World War II.

Career
Early in his career, Mantell worked on Paddy Chayefsky teleplays directed by Delbert Mann for The Philco Television Playhouse, including the titular character of The Bachelor Party. He also appeared in the anti-censorship episode "Storm Center" of the Westinghouse Desilu Playhouse, as well as the 1956 film adaptation by Daniel Taradash. 

Mantell was featured in the pilot of the crime drama, The Untouchables, starring Robert Stack that originally aired as a 2 part episode of the WDP. He later guest-starred in The Untouchables series itself, in the 2 part episode, "The Unhired Assassin", where he played Giuseppe Zangara, the would-be assassin of Franklin Delano Roosevelt who ended up accidentally assassinating Chicago Mayor Anton Cermak instead. 

In the 1974 film Chinatown, Mantell played Lawrence Walsh, associate of private eye Jake Gittes. He delivered the film's famous last line, "Forget it, Jake, it's Chinatown." The character of Walsh reappeared in The Two Jakes. He had a small, pivotal role in the gas station scene of Alfred Hitchcock's The Birds (1963).

Mantell appeared frequently in series television, including two episodes each of The Twilight Zone: "Nervous Man in a Four Dollar Room" (in a starring role) and "Steel" (co-starring with Lee Marvin); The Man from U.N.C.L.E., Ironside, and Maude. Mantell also appeared as a betrayed husband in the "Guilty Witness" episode of Alfred Hitchcock Presents. 

He had a recurring role from 1961 to 1962 as Ernie Briggs in six episodes of the CBS sitcom, Pete and Gladys, starring Harry Morgan and Cara Williams. Mantell also starred in season one, episode five ("Far from the Brave") of the TV series Combat! and in a 1963 episode of the sitcom Don't Call Me Charlie!. From 1967 to 1969 Mantell appeared five times on Mannix, four of which were in his recurring role of private detective Albie Loos.

Personal life
He had a wife, Mary, two daughters and a son.

He retired from acting in 1990 and on September 29, 2010, died in Tarzana, California, at the age of 94.

Filmography

References

External links

 
 

1915 births
2010 deaths
Male actors from New York City
American male film actors
American male television actors
American people of Austrian-Jewish descent
20th-century American male actors
Deaths from pneumonia in California
Male actors from Los Angeles
People from Brooklyn
Jewish American male actors
21st-century American Jews